John J. Giblin (February 14, 1909 – December 20, 1975) was an American Democratic Party politician and labor leader.

Early life
Giblin was born in Ireland on February 14, 1909, and came to the United States at age 19. He worked in the power plant at the Newark offices of the Prudential Insurance Company from 1929 until 1942, when he became the Supervisor of Heating and Repairs for the Newark Public Schools.

In 1942, Giblin became a member of the International Union of Operating Engineers Local 68.  He was elected Business Manager and President of the union in 1948 and held that post until his death.  He had also served as Chairman of the Board of Trustees of the International Union of Operating Engineers in Washington, D.C.

Political career
In May 1953, Giblin was elected to the Newark Charter Study Commission, which recommended a change to the mayor-council form of government.

In November 1954, he was elected to the Essex County Board of Chosen Freeholders. He served as a New Jersey State Senator in 1966 and 1967.

The U.S. Supreme Court decision in Reynolds v. Sims (more commonly known as One Man, One Vote), required redistricting by state legislatures for congressional districts to keep represented populations equal, as well as requiring both houses of state legislatures to have districts drawn that contained roughly equal populations, and to perform redistricting when needed.  Because of its population, Essex County gained three Senate seats.

In 1965, he was elected New Jersey State Senator.  He was defeated for re-election in 1967.  Giblin and his three running mates defeated four Republicans, including the incumbent, Senate Minority Leader C. Robert Sarcone.

New Jersey held a constitutional convention in 1966 to address reapportionment issues created by the One Man, One Vote decision. Following redistricting, Essex County gained two more seats, for a total of six. In 1967, Giblin and his Democratic running mates were defeated by a slate of Republican Senate candidates.

Giblin again sought election to the State Senate in 1971, running on an independent ticket. He finished 11th for five seats, finishing more than 50,000 votes behind the low-votegetting candidate.

He also served as Clerk to the Essex County Jury Commission, and a member of The New Jersey State Board of Mediation.

Personal
Giblin and his wife, the former Teresa Moran, had five children, including Thomas P. Giblin, a longtime New Jersey Assemblyman and former New Jersey Democratic State Chairman, and Vincent P. Giblin, the President of the international Union of Operating Engineers Local 68. A resident of West Orange, Giblin died at Mountainside Hospital in Glen Ridge, New Jersey.

Election results

1965 Essex County State Senator General Election

1967 Essex County State Senator General Election

1971 Essex County State Senator General Election

References

1909 births
1975 deaths
County commissioners in New Jersey
Irish emigrants to the United States
Democratic Party New Jersey state senators
People from County Roscommon
Politicians from Newark, New Jersey
People from West Orange, New Jersey
20th-century American politicians